Rasbora cryptica is a species of ray-finned fish in the genus Rasbora. It is endemic to Sarawak in Borneo.

References 

Rasboras
Fish of Malaysia
Freshwater fish of Borneo
Taxa named by Maurice Kottelat
Taxa named by Heok Hui Tan
Fish described in 2012